Home Entertainment Suppliers Pty. Ltd. (or HES) is an Australian company that distributes computer games and gaming equipment. HES' offices are based in Riverwood, Sydney. HES's founder and managing director is Sebastian Giompaolo.

They began distributing Commodore 64 titles such as Pitfall! in 1982 and Kung-Fu Master in 1985 and Atari 2600 titles nearing the end of the 1980s under the name Activision.

HES still remains a dominant distributor within Australia, despite not being well known. HES currently is the distributor for Mad Catz, Saitek, and Gamester joysticks, cables, memory cards, and other peripherals. HES also remains the official Australian distributor for Action Replay.

Quite a large number of software titles are currently also being distributed by HES for Windows, Xbox, PlayStation 2 and Game Boy Advance by publishers ZOO Digital Publishing, Tru Blu Entertainment and Phantagram.

In the past, HES had gained a reputation for developing and distributing some interesting peripherals such as their auto fire controllers, Game Boy power adaptors, Master System converters for the Mega Drive and adapters for NES games such as the HES Unidaptor and HES Unidaptor MKII.

In 1999, the company created the publishing arm Tru Blu Entertainment for software titles created by the company, including the hit NRL Rugby League and AFL Live titles.

Nintendo Entertainment System

Unlicensed

In the late 1980s and early 1990s, HES ported games from American Game Cartridges, American Video Entertainment (AVE), Bit Corp, Color Dreams, Epyx, Thin Chen Enterprise (Sachen, Joy Van, etc.) and Tengen onto the Nintendo Entertainment System (NES) as unlicensed titles, although they did not release games by Camerica or Active Enterprises. Most games were released in plastic cases like a video box with printed instructions on the inside, however sometimes the AVE titles were released in their original AVE boxes with a HES sticker simply stuck over AVE's original one.
HES at the time became widely known for their unlicensed distribution of NES games at budget prices. Nintendo tried to fight against all unlicensed companies by introducing a Nintendo Seal of Quality on all their products which signified that titles adorning the symbol are guaranteed to operate on their NES hardware. To combat this, HES introduced their own seal that mimicked Nintendo’s seal, possibly in the hope of confusing buyers.

In order to circumvent other methods that Nintendo created to stop unlicensed developers (10NES), HES developed the 'Piggy Back' or 'Dongle' games, where one could insert an official NES cart into the HES game and it operated the country code of the official title instead of HES'. This was so successful that HES also used the same technology to build a device to entirely bypass the 10NES security protocol which was released as the HES Unidaptor. The adapter allowed 72-pin and 60-pin NTSC NES/Famicom games to be played on a PAL NES.

HES introduced games to Australia that were not released elsewhere in the western world, and these have become very sought after classics. However, HES also chose to release their multigame cartridges and a few of their single game titles in very limited numbers. Such titles are extremely scarce and thus nearly impossible to find.

NES titles
 Arctic Adventure: Penguin & Seal
 Chiller
 Death Race 	
 Duck Maze
 F-15 City War
 Impossible Mission 2
 International Ultimate League Soccer
 Jackpot
 Little Red Hood
 Othello
 Pac-Man
 Pipemania
 Raid 2020
 Pyramid
 R.B.I. Baseball
 Sidewinder
 Super Sprint
 Toobin'
 Twin Eagle
 Vindicators

Multi-game cartridges

2 Pack Special (International Ultimate Soccer League (Magexa Soccer), Super Sprint) 
4 in 1 Fun Blaster Pak (Pipemania, Twin Eagle, Joyvan Kid, and Little Red Hood)3
4 in 1 Total Funpak (Pac-Man, Sidewinder, Duck Maze, and Othello)
4 in 1 Mind Blower Pak (Math Quiz, Jackpot, Arctic Adventure, and Incantation)
Maxi 15 (2 Variants, Red Cart which had Game Number 3 as "Death Race" and Game Number 6 as "Double Strike" and a more rarer Green Cart which has Game Number 3 as "Pyramid" and Game Number 6 as "Black Jack"
 Real Players Pack 6-Pak (has the same unique games as Caltron 6 in 1/Myriad 6 in 1)

Other

4 Pak All Action
4 Pak All Action was a 1995 unlicensed video game for the Sega Master System that was released exclusively in Australia. This game is only compatible with the Sega Master System 2 console. It includes four games: Power Block, Adventure Kid, Twin Mouse',' and Cave Dude.

Atari 2600 titles
HES released quite a few titles and multi game packs for the Atari 2600 Video Computer System. The cartridges are virtually identical to the Activision cartridges, but the Activision logo on the underside is blacked out.
 2 Pak Special (Dungeon Master, Creature Strike)
 Smash Hit Pak (5-in-1 cartridge: Frogger, Stampede, Seaquest, Boxing, Skiing)
 Super Hit Pak'' (5-in-1 cartridge: River Raid, Grand Prix, Fishing Derby, Sky Jinks, Checkers)

References

External links

NESWORLD
NintendoAge
AtariAge - Companies - HES
ZOO Digital Publishing website

Video game companies of Australia
Video game companies established in 1984
Australian companies established in 1984
Companies based in Sydney
Video game publishers